The origin of death is a theme in the myths of many cultures. Death is a universal feature of human life, so stories about its origin appear to be universal in human cultures. As such it is a type of origin myth, a myth that describes the origin of some feature of the natural or social world. No one type of these myths is universal, but each region has its own characteristic types. Such myths have therefore been a frequent topic of study in the field of comparative mythology.

Africa

Pervasively in the myths of African cultures, in the beginning there was no death. This can be because a supreme being makes people young again when they grow old; people die but go to heaven to live. In some stories eternal life is lost through some flaw (such as greed, curiosity, stubbornness or arrogance), or as a punishment for disobedience, or as the result of human indifference. Other themes are the failure of a message to be delivered to humans, or a severing of the link between heaven and Earth. Sometimes it is as a result of an accident.

Asante 
In Asante mythology, death came to humanity as a result of Tano being unable to best Owuo (the Asante embodiment of death) in a series of contests to claim a hunter, and the same for Owuo. The two came to an agreement. If a human, specifically a warrior, was dying Tano and Owuo would race to them in an attempt to claim their souls. If Tano got there first, the person would not die. However, If Owuo got there first the person would die.

Krachi 

According to Krachi traditional stories, death came to humanity as a result of a young Krachi boy pouring reviving medicine into the eye of a dead Owuo (yes, the same God as the Asante God of death), who had been killed after the townspeople of the boy's hometown were told by the boy that Owuo had canabalised 3 people the boy knew and the townspeople resolved to kill Owuo by setting Owuo's long hair ablaze, which, like dry grass quickly caught fire and, like TNT, quickly traveled to the head of Owuo, killing him. In his hair was a reviving medicine, which the boy and the townspeople used to revive the 3 people by splashing it on their bones. Feeling sorry for Owuo, specifically because Owuo had been kind to the boy, the boy poured the medicine into Owuo's eye, reviving it. Now the eye blinks and winks, and every time the eye of Owuo blinks, someone dies.

North America

The origin of death is a common theme in Native American mythology. The myths of the plateau tribes blame its origin on the interference of the trickster figure Coyote. The Chiricahua Apache myth also blames Coyote. The plains tribes ascribe it to the result of unfavorable chance. For example, in the Blackfeet account, Old Man and Old Woman arguing over whether people should die, with Old Woman using magic to ensure that the sign that they agreed upon gave her desired result.

Among the native peoples of the Western United States, a common explanation of death was that it was the result of a debate between two people or animals in which one would favour death and the other immortality. For example, the story of the Thompson Indians was that Raven wanted death as there would otherwise be too many men. Coyote preferred sleep to death but was outvoted by Crow, Fly and Maggot, who sided with Raven. Raven's daughter was then the first to die and so Raven wanted to reverse his choice. But Coyote, the trickster, said that the decision was now irrevocable.

Oceania
In Oceania, the most common myth is that originally people had the power to rejuvenate themselves by shedding their skin like a snake. However, when somebody, usually an old woman, does this, she frightens her grandchildren, who cry until she resumes her old skin, an act which mandates death for future generations.

Polynesia

In Polynesian mythology, death is the result of the hero Māui being swallowed up by Hine-nui-te-po or Night. If he had escaped, mankind would be immortal, however one of the birds that accompanied him burst out laughing, awakening Hine-nui-te-po who crushed Māui to death, ending hopes of immortality with him.

Western civilization

Christianity

According to Christianity, death is a consequence of the fall of man from a prior state of innocence, as described in the Book of Genesis.

Greek mythology

In an early Greek myth, death is a consequence of the disagreement between Zeus and Prometheus. As a result of this quarrel, Zeus creates woman, in the form of Pandora and presents her to Prometheus' brother Epimetheus, with death being one of the results of his opening of Pandora's box, which she brought with her.

Deities of death 
Such myths of death and the end have brought to life, gods/goddess that guides one to their death. In some religions there are deities that even control when an individual will die. For example, in Greek mythology the goddess who has control over an individuals death would be Atropos. (known as the one who cuts the thread of life.) In a modern sense, the most common deity of death is the grim reaper. Originally "the grim reaper" stemmed from Chronos in Greek mythology, Chronos was the father of Zeus, Poseidon, and Hades. He was known as all-powerful and the king of the titans. As time moved forward the old tales of Greek mythology did not necessarily influence mass amounts of people as it did in earlier times. A new grim reaper had emerged during the 14th century in Europe; this concept was due to the worst pandemic in that century, and the average person experienced death too many times to be able to process it as a natural part of life. Thus, another grim reaper was created to still the running minds of citizens of 14th century Europe.

See also 
 Archetypal literary criticism
 Death and culture
 Epic of Gilgamesh
 Immortality
 Mythology

Notes

References

Further reading
 
 
 
 
 
 
 
 Berezkin, Yuri, 'Why Are People Mortal? World Mythology and the 'Out-of-Africa' Scenario' in 
 Berezkin, Yuri, 'Thinking about death from the very beginning. African origins of some mythological motifs', in Proceedings of the International Conference on Comparative Mythology (Beijing, May 11–13, 2006), Beijing: Beijing University Press.

External links
 The Origin of Death, a chapter of Modern Mythology, by Andrew Lang
https://www2.nau.edu/~gaud/bio301/content/grmrp.htm 
Collections of myths
 African Stories Database
 First People—contains an alphabetized list of Native American Legends

Mythology
Cultural aspects of death
Religion and death
Origin myths